Birane Ndoye (born 4 April 1994) is a Senegalese professional footballer who plays for Niarry Tally.

He is a younger brother of former Senegal international player Issa Ndoye, who played alongside Birane for Slavia Mozyr.

References

External links 
 
 Profile at footballdatabase.eu

1994 births
Living people
Senegalese footballers
Senegalese expatriate footballers
Expatriate footballers in Belarus
Association football defenders
FC Slavia Mozyr players
ASC Niarry Tally players